Bruun's algorithm is a fast Fourier transform (FFT) algorithm based on an unusual recursive polynomial-factorization approach, proposed for powers of two by G. Bruun in 1978 and generalized to arbitrary even composite sizes by H. Murakami in 1996. Because its operations involve only real coefficients until the last computation stage, it was initially proposed as a way to efficiently compute the discrete Fourier transform (DFT) of real data. Bruun's algorithm has not seen widespread use, however, as approaches based on the ordinary Cooley–Tukey FFT algorithm have been successfully adapted to real data with at least as much efficiency. Furthermore, there is evidence that Bruun's algorithm may be intrinsically less accurate than Cooley–Tukey in the face of finite numerical precision  (Storn, 1993).

Nevertheless, Bruun's algorithm illustrates an alternative algorithmic framework that can express both itself and the Cooley–Tukey algorithm, and thus provides an interesting perspective on FFTs that permits mixtures of the two algorithms and other generalizations.

A polynomial approach to the DFT 

Recall that the DFT is defined by the formula:

For convenience, let us denote the N roots of unity by ωNn (n = 0, ..., N − 1):

and define the polynomial x(z) whose coefficients are xn:

The DFT can then be understood as a reduction of this polynomial; that is, Xk is given by:

where mod denotes the polynomial remainder operation. The key to fast algorithms like Bruun's or Cooley–Tukey comes from the fact that one can perform this set of N remainder operations in recursive stages.

Recursive factorizations and FFTs 

In order to compute the DFT, we need to evaluate the remainder of  modulo N degree-1 polynomials as described above. Evaluating these remainders one by one is equivalent to the evaluating the usual DFT formula directly, and requires O(N2) operations.

The product of all of the monomials  for k=0..N-1 is simply  (whose roots are clearly the N roots of unity). One then wishes to find a recursive factorization of  into polynomials of few terms and smaller and smaller degree. To compute the DFT, one takes  modulo each level of this factorization in turn, recursively, until one arrives at the monomials and the final result. If each level of the factorization splits every polynomial into an O(1) (constant-bounded) number of smaller polynomials, each with an O(1) number of nonzero coefficients, then the modulo operations for that level take O(N) time; since there will be a logarithmic number of levels, the overall complexity is O (N log N).

More explicitly, suppose for example that , and that , and so on.  The corresponding FFT algorithm would consist of first computing xk(z) = x(z) mod
Fk(z), then computing xk,j(z) = xk(z) mod
Fk,j(z), and so on, recursively creating more and more remainder polynomials of smaller and smaller degree until one arrives at the final degree-0 results.

Moreover, as long as the polynomial factors at each stage are relatively prime (which for polynomials means that they have no common roots), one can construct a dual algorithm by reversing the process with the Chinese remainder theorem.

Cooley–Tukey as polynomial factorization

The standard decimation-in-frequency (DIF) radix-r Cooley–Tukey algorithm corresponds closely to a recursive factorization. That is, Cooley–Tukey ensures that all subproblems are also DFTs, whereas this is not generally true for an arbitrary recursive factorization (such as Bruun's, below).

The Bruun factorization 

The basic Bruun algorithm for powers of two N=2n factorizes z2n-1 recursively via the rules:

where a is a real constant with |a| ≤ 2.

At stage s, s=0,1,2,n-1, the intermediate state consists of 2s polynomials  of degree 2n-s - 1 or less , where

By the construction of the factorization of z2n-1, the polynomials ps,m(z) each encode  2n-s values

of the Fourier transform, for m=0, the covered indices are k=0, 2k, 2∙2s, 3∙2s,…, (2n-s-1)∙2s, for m>0 the covered indices are k=m, 2s+1-m, 2s+1+m, 2∙2s+1-m, 2∙2s+1+m, …, 2n-m.

During the transition to the next stage, the polynomial  is reduced to the polynomials  and  via polynomial division. If one wants to keep the polynomials in increasing index order, this pattern requires an implementation with two arrays. An implementation in place produces a predictable, but highly unordered sequence of indices, for example for N=16 the final order of the 8 linear remainders is (0, 4, 2, 6, 1, 7, 3, 5).

At the end of the recursion, for s=n-1, there remain 2n-1 linear polynomials encoding two Fourier coefficients X0 and X2n-1 for the first and for the any other kth polynomial the coefficients Xk and X2n-k.

At each recursive stage, all of the polynomials of the common degree 4M-1 are reduced to two parts of half the degree 2M-1. The divisor of this polynomial remainder computation is a quadratic polynomial zm, so that all reductions can be reduced to polynomial divisions of cubic by quadratic polynomials. There are N/2=2n-1 of these small divisions at each stage, leading to an O (N log N) algorithm for the FFT.

Moreover, since all of these polynomials have purely real coefficients (until the very last stage), they automatically exploit the special case where the inputs xn are purely real to save roughly a factor of two in computation and storage.  One can also take straightforward advantage of the case of real-symmetric data for computing the discrete cosine transform (Chen and Sorensen, 1992).

Generalization to arbitrary radices 

The Bruun factorization, and thus the Bruun FFT algorithm, was generalized to handle arbitrary even composite lengths, i.e. dividing the polynomial degree by an arbitrary radix (factor), as follows.  First, we define a set of polynomials φN,α(z) for positive integers N and for α in [0,1) by:

Note that all of the polynomials that appear in the Bruun factorization above can be written in this form. Hence these polynomials can be recursively factorized for a factor (radix) r via:

References

 Georg Bruun, "z-Transform DFT filters and FFTs," IEEE Trans. on Acoustics, Speech and Signal Processing (ASSP) 26 (1), 56-63 (1978).
 H. J. Nussbaumer, Fast Fourier Transform and Convolution Algorithms (Springer-Verlag: Berlin, 1990).
 Yuhang Wu, "New FFT structures based on the Bruun algorithm," IEEE Trans. ASSP 38 (1), 188-191 (1990)
 Jianping Chen and Henrik Sorensen, "An efficient FFT algorithm for real-symmetric data," Proc. ICASSP 5, 17-20 (1992).
 Rainer Storn, "Some results in fixed point error analysis of the Bruun-FTT  algorithm," IEEE Trans. Signal Process. 41 (7), 2371-2375 (1993).
 Hideo Murakami, "Real-valued decimation-in-time and decimation-in-frequency algorithms," IEEE Trans. Circuits Syst. II: Analog and Digital Sig. Proc. 41 (12), 808-816 (1994).
 Hideo Murakami, "Real-valued fast discrete Fourier transform and cyclic convolution algorithms of highly composite even length," Proc. ICASSP 3, 1311-1314 (1996).
 Shashank Mittal, Md. Zafar Ali Khan, M. B. Srinivas, "A Comparative Study of Different FFT Architectures for Software Defined Radio", Lecture Notes in Computer Science 4599 (Embedded Computer Systems: Architectures, Modeling, and Simulation), 375-384 (2007).  Proc. 7th Intl. Workshop, SAMOS 2007 (Samos, Greece, July 16–19, 2007).

FFT algorithms